John Wild may refer to:

Jack Wild (1952–2006), English actor
John Benton Wild (1806–1857), Australian politician
John Caspar Wild (1804–1846), American painter
John Daniel Wild (1902–1972), American philosopher
John J. Wild (1914–2009), developer of ultrasound in cancer diagnosis
Paul Wild (Australian scientist) (John Paul Wild, born 1923), Australian radio astronomer
Frank Wild (John Wild, 1873–1939), Antarctic explorer
Jonathan Wild (1682–1725), London criminal
John Wild (priest) (1904–1992), English dean and college head
John Wild (runner) (born 1953), English cross country and fell runner
John Wild (cricketer) (born 1935), English cricketer 
John James Wild (1824–1900), Swiss linguist, oceanographer and natural history illustrator and lithographer
John Wild (judge), judge at the Court of Appeal of New Zealand (2011–2017)

See also
John Wilde (disambiguation)